Jorge Pablo Chapoy Bosque (born 26 April 1973) is a Mexican archer.

Chapoy competed at the 2004 Summer Olympics in men's individual archery.  He was defeated in the first round of elimination, placing 34th overall.

Chapoy was also a member of the 12th-place Mexican men's archery team at the 2004 Summer Olympics.

References

External links
 

1973 births
Living people
Mexican male archers
Archers at the 2004 Summer Olympics
Olympic archers of Mexico
Sportspeople from Monclova
Archers at the 2003 Pan American Games
Pan American Games silver medalists for Mexico
Medalists at the 2003 Pan American Games
Pan American Games medalists in archery
21st-century Mexican people